The Saint Louis River (abbreviated St. Louis River) is a river in the U.S. states of Minnesota and Wisconsin that flows into Lake Superior. Near the Twin Ports of Duluth, Minnesota and Superior, Wisconsin, the river becomes a freshwater estuary.

History 

According to Warren Upham, the Ojibwe name of the river is Gichigami-ziibi (Great-lake River). He notes:
"The river was probably so named by Pierre Gaultier de Varennes, sieur de La Vérendrye (1685–1749), who was a very active explorer, in the years 1731 and onward. Shortly before his death the king of France in 1749 conferred on him the cross of Saint Louis as a recognition of the importance of his discoveries, and thence the name of the Saint Louis River appears to have come. On Jean-Baptiste-Louis Franquelin's map (1688) and Philippe Buache's map (1754), it is called the Rivière du Fond du Lac, and the map by Gilles Robert de Vaugondy (1755) and Jonathan Carver's map (1778) is the earliest to give the present name."

The river was a vital link connecting the Mississippi River waterways to the west with the Great Lakes to the east.
Jay Cooke State Park is located near the mouth of the river and is the site of a canoe portage used by Native Americans, European explorers, fur traders, Voyageurs, coureurs des bois, and missionaries of the 18th and 19th centuries. Above Carlton, travelers proceeded upstream and continued on to Lake Vermillion and the Rainy River. Or they may have traveled southwest up the East Savanna River, portaged the grueling 6-mile long Savanna Portage (now a state park), and then paddled on to the Mississippi River.

Pollution

 
By the mid 20th century, the lower Saint Louis River became one of the most heavily polluted waterways in the state. Holling Clancy Holling, in his 1941 book Paddle-to-the-Sea, illustrated the polluted state of the Saint Louis River. By 1975, the river became an Environmental Protection Agency Area of Concern. The Western Lake Superior Sanitary District (WLSSD) was established in 1971 to address serious pollution problems in the lower Saint Louis River Basin. WLSSD's regional wastewater treatment plant began operating in 1978. Within two years, fish populations rebounded and anglers began returning to the river. Through the 1980s and 1990s, additional cleanups took place, but the river remains polluted.  In 2013 the State of Minnesota abruptly pulled out of a project intended to research the mercury problem in the river.    The cooperating agencies including Wisconsin DNR and the Fond du Lac Tribe were not in agreement with the ending of the study.    The level of mercury is so high that strong limitations on consumption of the fish are in effect by the Minnesota Department of Health which for example limit consumption of walleye for a 50-pound child to 1/6 of a pound per month or no more than one pound every six months.

Saint Louis River AOC
The St. Louis River Area of Concern (AOC) is one of 43 AOCs across the Great Lakes under the Great Lakes Water Quality Agreement in 1987. The AOC boundary includes the lower  of the St. Louis River, from upstream of Cloquet, Minnesota, to its mouth at the Duluth/Superior Harbor and Lake Superior, and the Nemadji River watershed. Draining  of watershed and encompassing a  area, the St. Louis River is the second largest U.S.-based AOC. As the largest tributary to Lake Superior, the St. Louis River is vital to the regional economy and encompasses the Port of Duluth-Superior, an essential port for Great Lakes shipping.

Historical industrial use of the river, before the onset of modern pollution laws, has resulted in sediments contaminated with: mercury, dioxins, polychlorinated biphenyls (PCBs), polycyclic aromatic hydrocarbons (PAHs), and other toxins. Pollutants in the AOC are also due to: historical discharges, Superfund sites, discharges from wastewater and from landfills, and other point-source discharges within the AOC.

An impairment of beneficial uses means a change in the chemical, physical or biological integrity of the Great Lakes system sufficient to cause significant environmental degradation. A 1992 Remedial Action Plan determined that nine "beneficial use impairments" existed in the AOC including:

 Fish Consumption Advisories
 Degraded Fish and Wildlife Populations
 Fish Tumors and Other Deformities
 Degradation of Benthos
 Restrictions on Dredging
 Excessive Loading of Sediment and Nutrients
 Beach Closings and Body Contact Restrictions
 Degradation of Aesthetics
 Loss of Fish and Wildlife Habitat

Two of these impairments have been removed from the designation (degradation of aesthetics in 2014, fish tumors and other deformities in 2019) following remediation projects. Reaching these targets will lead to the goal of delisting the AOC, which means the ecological benefits of the St. Louis River have been restored to an acceptable level.

Recreation

The river is fished for walleye, northern pike, smallmouth bass, largemouth bass, bluegill, black crappie, and channel catfish populations. Other species of rough fish include Shorthead Redhorse and White Sucker.  The river is frequented by those traveling the Minnesota DNR Saint Louis River Water Trail, which has campsites and angling.

Attempts to introduce sturgeon are underway; sturgeon, if caught, are to be returned.  While native to the river at one time, overfishing and pollution wiped them out many years ago.  In 1983 the DNR, the Fond du Lac Band of Lake Superior Chippewa, and others began rebuilding spawning habitat and introducing baby sturgeon into the river.  In 2016 MPR reported, "Slowly, steadily, numbers increased as the stocked fish took hold in the river. Five years ago, tribal biologists found their first fry from naturally reproducing sturgeon, a sign that a healthy fish population could grow on its own. Minnesota even began allowing catch-and-release fishing last year."

The Saint Louis River Trail Association is planning the construction of a long-distance hiking trail along more than half the length of the river. Construction of the first 36-mile segment began in early 2012, with cooperation from the Minnesota DNR; the trail association hopes to have this section completed in 2015.

See also
List of rivers of Minnesota
List of longest streams of Minnesota
List of rivers of Wisconsin
Pokegama Bay

Gallery

References

External links
St. Louis River Trail Association
St. Louis River Citizens Action Committee
Great Lakes Areas of Concern: St. Louis River
Minnesota Place Names
Western Lake Superior Sanitary District
Minnesota DNR: St. Louis River Water Trail
WI DNR St. Louis River AOC Webpage
MPCA St. Louis River AOC Webpage

Rivers of Carlton County, Minnesota
Rivers of Douglas County, Wisconsin
Rivers of St. Louis County, Minnesota
Rivers of Minnesota
Rivers of Wisconsin
Geography of Duluth, Minnesota
Borders of Wisconsin
Borders of Minnesota
Tributaries of Lake Superior